Spangenberg is a surname. Notable people with the surname include:

August Gottlieb Spangenberg (1704–1792), German theologian and minister
Bill Spangenberg (active 1947–1962), bass singer in the Buffalo Bills barbershop quartet
Cory Spangenberg (born 1991), American baseball player
Craig Spangenberg (1914–1998), American trial attorney
Cyriacus Spangenberg (1528–1604), German theologian and historian
Detlev Spangenberg (born 1944), German politician
Doug Spangenberg (born 1975), American music video director and documentary film maker
Evgeni Pavlovich Spangenberg (1898-1968), Soviet ornithologist
Frank Spangenberg (born 1957), American game show contestant
George Spangenberg (1912-2000), American aircraft designer
Hugo Spangenberg (born 1975), Argentine chess grandmaster
Jeff Spangenberg (active from 1991), American video game producer and entrepreneur
Johannes Ernst Spangenberg (1755-1814), American fraktur artist
Karl Spangenberg, American engineer
Marco Spangenberg (born 1980), German sport shooter who competed in the 2004 Summer Olympics
Theunis Spangenberg (born 1983), South African golfer
Trevor Spangenberg (born 1991), American professional soccer player

Surnames of German origin